John Charlton (also Charleton or Cherleton), 2nd Baron Cherleton, 2nd Lord Charlton of Powys (died 1360) succeeded his father John Charlton, 1st Baron Charlton to the title in 1353. He married Maud Mortimer, daughter of Roger Mortimer, 1st Earl of March and Joan de Geneville, before 13 April 1319. He fought in the Wars of Gascony in the Hundred Years' War and held the office of Lord Chamberlain of the Household as his father had before him. He died before 30 August 1360. They had one son John Charleton, 3rd Baron Cherleton who succeeded to the title.

References

1300 births
1360 deaths
14th-century English nobility
2